Michael Robert Leighton Blair (born 20 April 1981) is a Scottish rugby union coach who was formerly a professional player. He is the head coach of Edinburgh. He played at scrum-half for Glasgow Warriors, Newcastle Falcons, CA Brive and Edinburgh Rugby. He represented the Scotland national side 85 times, as well as the touring with the British & Irish Lions in 2009. He retired from playing on 21 April 2016 aged 35. He then became an assistant coach with Glasgow Warriors and then an assistant coach of the Scottish national team. He was the first Scottish player to be nominated for the title of IRB World Player of the Year.

Club career
Blair spent most of his club career at Edinburgh, and was named in the Pro12 Dream team at the end of the 2007/08 season.

Blair spent the 2012–13 season playing in France with Brive helping them to gain promotion back to the Top 14.

Blair then returned to the UK to play for the Newcastle Falcons in the English Premiership.  He joined Glasgow Warriors for the 2015/16 season.

In the 2014–15 season, Blair became assistant coach of Ponteland Rugby Club.

International career
Blair's international debut came on 15 June 2002 against Canada and scored his first try for his country in the same game.

Blair was a member of Scotland's 2003, 2007 and 2011 World Cup squads.

Blair was injured playing for Edinburgh against the Llanelli Scarlets in January 2007 and required surgery on his shoulder which prevented him from playing in the entire 2007 Six Nations Championship.

Blair was made captain of his country for the first time against Ireland in the 2008 Six Nations Championship and for the next 12 consecutive games.
At the 2008 Six Nations, he captained his squad to a 15–9 victory over England at Murrayfield to win the 2008 Calcutta Cup.
He captained the national side 14 times in total.

Blair made his 50th appearance against Argentina in 2008 (2nd test).

Blair was Edinburgh Player of the year in 2006 and 2008, Scotland Pro Team Player of the Year in 2008, and Scotland Player of the Year in 2008. He was nominated for the IRB Player of the Year in 2008, the first Scot to be nominated for this award. That year he featured in a list of the 50 best rugby players in the world by The Independent newspaper.

Having been left out of the original Lions touring squad to South Africa in 2009, Blair was called up as a replacement for the injured Tomás O'Leary on 11 May, starting against The Presidents XV and the Southern Kings and coming off the bench against the Sharks.

Blair was included in Scotland's 2011 Rugby World Cup Squad. He scored the first try in the team's first match against Romania on 10 September, a 34–24 victory to Scotland. He started against England later in the tournament winning his 75th cap.
Blair earned his final cap before retirement against South Africa in November 2012.

Blair got 85 caps for his country. He is Scotland's most capped scrum-half of all time.

Personal life
Blair attended the Edinburgh Academy. He is married with two children.

Blair has an older brother Peter, and two younger brothers, David and Alex. David played fly half for Sale Sharks and Edinburgh Rugby between 2007 and 2011, and Alex, who also played for Edinburgh Rugby from 2010 to 2011.

References

External links
Scotland profile

1981 births
Living people
Scottish rugby union players
People educated at Edinburgh Academy
British & Irish Lions rugby union players from Scotland
Rugby union scrum-halves
Rugby union players from Edinburgh
Edinburgh Rugby players
CA Brive players
Scotland international rugby union players
Boroughmuir RFC players
Edinburgh Academicals rugby union players
Alumni of the University of Edinburgh
Glasgow Warriors players
Glasgow Warriors coaches
Alumni of Durham University
Durham University RFC players
Newcastle Falcons players